Caryocolum vartianorum is a moth of the family Gelechiidae. It is found in Afghanistan. It occurs at altitudes between 2,100 and 2,500 meters.

The length of the forewings is about 6 mm. The forewings are whitish, mottled with light brown. There are distinct dark brown markings, often lined with orange-brown. Adults have been recorded on wing from late July to early August.

References

Moths described in 1988
vartianorum
Moths of Asia